William Antony Burlton Bennett (25 November 1807 – 20 February 1886) was an English cricketer who played for MCC between 1832 and 1845 and once for Kent County Cricket Club in 1844. Bennett played twelve matches in all following his debut for The Bs at Lord's in 1831 against an All-England team. He was born in Calcutta, India, and died in Westminster.

References

External links
 

1807 births
1886 deaths
Cricketers from Kolkata
English cricketers
English cricketers of 1826 to 1863
Kent cricketers
Marylebone Cricket Club cricketers
Married v Single cricketers
Non-international England cricketers
The Bs cricketers
19th-century sportsmen
A to K v L to Z cricketers